Exposition Hall may refer to:

St. Louis Exposition and Music Hall
Winter Garden at Exposition Hall

Architectural disambiguation pages